List of recording artists performing on or signed to Melodiya at one time or another.



A
ABBA (pop group)
Alexander Alexeev (conductor)
Karel Ančerl (conductor)
Aria (Russian  metal band)
Vladimir Ashkenazy (pianist, conductor)

B
Rudolf Barshai (violist)
Dimitri Bashkirov (pianist)
The Beatles (rock band)
Black Sabbath
Lazar Berman (pianist)
Borodin String Quartet
Mikhail Boyarsky (singer)

C
Eric Clapton (song 'Cocaine' omitted from Slowhand album)
Bing Crosby
Creedence Clearwater Revival

D
Dave Rave (Dave Rave Group)
Deep Purple

F
Vladimir Fedoseyev (conductor)

G
Anna German (singer)
Grigory Ginzburg (pianist)
Emil Gilels (pianist)
Dizzy Gillespie (jazz trumpeter)

I

 Julio Iglesias

J

 Mahalia Jackson

K
Leonid Kogan (violinist)
Kiril Kondrashin (conductor)
Vladimir Krainev (pianist)
Eduard Khil (singer)
Eson Kandov (singer)

L
Heli Lääts (mezzo-soprano)
Valentina Levko (mezzo-soprano)
Uno Loop
John Lennon
Led Zeppelin

M
 Mamas And Papas
 Muslim Magomayev (musician)
 Paul McCartney (musician)
 Tamara Milashkina (soprano)
 Mister Twister (band)
 Mashina Vremeni (band)
 Anatoliy Mokrenko (baritone)
 Yevgeny Mravinsky (conductor)

N
Alexandre Naoumenko (tenor)
Nautilus Pompilius (band)
Tatiana Nikolayeva (pianist)
Heinrich Neuhaus (pianist)
Stanislav Neuhaus (pianist)

O
David Oistrakh (violinist)

P
Oscar Peterson (jazz pianist)
Nikolai Petrov (pianist)
Viktoria Postnikova (pianist)
Alla Pugacheva (singer)
Raimonds Pauls (pianist)
Pink Floyd

Q

R
Sviatoslav Richter (pianist)
Mstislav Rostropovich (cellist)
Gennadi Rozhdestvensky (conductor)
 Sofia Rotaru (singer)
Russya (Ukrainian pop star, one of the last acts to release an album on the Melodiya label)
Cliff Richard
Kenny Rogers

S
Samuel Samosud (conductor)
Kurt Sanderling (conductor)
Daniil Shafran (cellist)
Dmitri Shostakovich (pianist)
Shostakovich Quartet
Alexander Slobodyanik (pianist) aka Slobodyanik, Aleksander
Vera Soukupova (mezzo-soprano)
Soyol Erdene (rock band)
Yevgeny Svetlanov (conductor, composer, and pianist)
Henryk Szeryng (violinist)

T
Taneyev Quartet
Anahit Tsitsikian (violinist)
Tsvety (rock band)
The Second Half (progressive rock band)
The Rolling Stones
The Moody Blues
Pete Townshend

V
Vladimir Viardo (pianist)
Galina Vishnevskaya (soprano)
Mikhail Voskresensky (pianist)
Vladimir Vysotsky (singer/songwriter)

Y
Vladimir Yampolsky (pianist)
Yuri Antonov (singer)

Z
Yakov Zak (pianist)
Zodiaks/Zodiac

References

Lists of recording artists by label
Russian record labels